The following radio stations broadcast on AM frequency 830 kHz: 830 AM is a United States clear-channel frequency. WCCO Minneapolis is the dominant Class A station on 830 kHz.

Argentina
 LT8 in Rosario, Santa Fe.
 Radio del Pueblo in Buenos Aires.

Mexico
 XEITE-AM in Mexico City
 XELN in Linares, Nuevo León
 XEPUR-AM in Cherán, Michoacán

United States
Stations in bold are clear-channel stations.

References

Lists of radio stations by frequency